Turning Torso is a neo-futurist residential skyscraper built in Malmö, Sweden in 2005. It was the tallest building in the Nordic region until September 2022, when it was surpassed by Karlatornet in Gothenburg, which is still under construction. Located on the Swedish side of the Öresund strait, it was built and is owned by Swedish cooperative housing association HSB. It is regarded as the second twisted skyscraper in the world to receive the title after Telekom Tower in Malaysia.

It was designed by Spanish architect, structural engineer, sculptor and painter Santiago Calatrava and officially opened on 27 August 2005. Turning Torso won the 2005 Gold Emporis Skyscraper Award; and in 2015, the 10 Year Award from the Council on Tall Buildings and Urban Habitat.

Design
Turning Torso is based on a sculpture by Calatrava, also called Twisting Torso, a white marble piece based on the form of a twisting human being.

In 1999, HSB Malmö's former managing director, Johnny Örbäck, saw the sculpture in a brochure presenting Calatrava in connection with his contribution to the architectural competition for the Öresund Bridge. It was on this occasion that  Örbäck was inspired to build HSB Turning Torso. Shortly afterwards he travelled to Zurich to meet Calatrava, and ask him to design a residential building based on the idea of a structure of twisting cubes.

It is a solid, immobile building constructed in nine segments of five-story pentagons that twist relative to each other as it rises; the topmost segment is twisted 90 degrees clockwise from the ground floor. Each floor consists of an irregular pentagonal shape rotating around the vertical core, which is supported by an exterior steel framework. The two bottom segments are intended as office space. Segments three to nine house 147 apartments.

Construction
Construction started in the summer of 2001. The local politicians deemed it important for the inhabitants to have a new symbol for Malmö in lieu of the crane that had been used for shipbuilding and somewhat symbolised the city's blue collar roots.

The construction of part of this building was featured on Discovery Channel Extreme Engineering TV programme which showed how a floor of the building was constructed.

Prior to the construction of Turning Torso, the  Kronprinsen had been the city's tallest building.

The apartments were initially supposed to be sold, but insufficient interest resulted in the apartments being let. The owner has several times unsuccessfully tried to sell the building. Construction costs for the building were over twice the initial budgeted costs.

Events
On 18 August 2006, Austrian skydiver Felix Baumgartner parachuted onto the Turning Torso, and then jumped off it.

Floor 49 is home to the public observation deck while floors 50–52 contain a private club, meeting events, the reception, and the venue restaurant.

Floor 53 and 54 in the Turning Torso are conference floors booked and managed by Sky High Meetings. Since 2009 the owner, HSB, has decided to let the public visit these floors but only on special scheduled days, and pre-booking is required.

Gallery

See also
 List of tallest buildings in the world
 List of tallest buildings in Europe
 List of tallest buildings in Sweden
 List of twisted buildings
 Shanghai Tower, Tallest twisted building
 Azrieli Sarona Tower

Notes

References

External links

 
 Fullscreen panorama from Turning Torso
 PERI GmbH - From a sculpture to a building
 The New Yorker, October 31 2005, "The Sculptor" Link broken, Nov 2011
 Torso Tower Blog
 Short films of Turning Torso from various locations

Buildings and structures in Malmö
Skyscrapers in Sweden
Towers in Sweden
Santiago Calatrava structures
Residential skyscrapers
Skyscraper office buildings in Sweden
Residential buildings completed in 2005
2005 establishments in Sweden
Twisted buildings and structures
Modernist architecture in Sweden
Postmodern architecture
High-tech architecture
Landmarks in Sweden
Neo-futurism architecture
21st-century establishments in Skåne County